Daniel Eslava (born 1902, date of death unknown) was a Mexican middle-distance runner and racewalker. He competed in the men's 1500 metres, men's 5000 metres and men's 10 kilometres walk at the 1924 Summer Olympics.

References

External links
 

1902 births
Year of death missing
Athletes (track and field) at the 1924 Summer Olympics
Mexican male middle-distance runners
Mexican male long-distance runners
Mexican male racewalkers
Olympic athletes of Mexico
Place of birth missing
Central American and Caribbean Games medalists in athletics
20th-century Mexican people